Daniel Monserrat, better known by his stage name Dani M (born in Gävle on 6 January 1990), is a rapper, reggae and hip hop solo artist from Uppsala, Sweden. Monserrat first gained recognition after being a featured singer in hit songs in 2012–2013 by Kartellen, Syster Sol and Labyrint. His own solo career thereafter gained popular acclaim alongside Syster Sol, both singers in the reggae & hiphop scenes, and he quickly received top reviews among Swedish newspapers' music critics and music magazines.

He was born to a Finnish mother and a Venezuelan father and is the brother of Swedish rapper Moncho.

On several occasions, Montserrat has been criticised in Swedish media for making repeated antisemitic and conspiratory remarks. Montserrat himself has repeatedly denied this and responded to all media with a statement that he is not a racist or anti-semite, and that he himself is an immigrant in Sweden who "loves people from all the world, and has no racism towards jews". He also wrote on his official Facebook page that he was sorry for having "spoken clumsy".

Discography

Albums

Singles

Featured in

Other charted songs

Notes

References

External links
Facebook

Swedish hip hop musicians
Swedish-language singers
1990 births
Living people
Swedish people of Finnish descent
Swedish people of Venezuelan descent
Musicians from Uppsala
21st-century Swedish singers
21st-century Swedish male singers